Klengel is a German surname. People with that name include:
 August Alexander Klengel (1783-1852), German pianist, organist and composer, son of Johann Christian
  (1751-1824), German engraver and painter, father of August Alexander
 Julius Klengel (1859-1933), German cellist and composer, brother of Paul
 Paul Klengel (1854-1935), German violinist/violist/pianist and composer, brother of Julius
 Wolf Caspar von Klengel (1634–1691), Baroque architect in Dresden

German-language surnames